Gongduk or Gongdu (it is also known as Gongdubikha) is an endangered Sino-Tibetan language spoken by about 1,000 people in a few inaccessible villages located near the Kuri Chhu river in the Gongdue Gewog of Mongar District in eastern Bhutan. The names of the villages are Bala, Dagsa, Damkhar, Pam, Pangthang, and Yangbari (Ethnologue).

Gongduk has complex verbal morphology, which Ethnologue considers a retention from Proto-Tibeto-Burman, and is lexically highly divergent. On this basis, it is apparently not part of any major subgroup and will probably have to be assigned to its own branch.

The people are said to have come from hunters that would move from place to place at times.

The language is notable for only being discovered by linguists in 1991. Currently, George van Driem is working towards the completion of a description of Gongduk based on his work with native speakers in the Gongduk area.

Classification
George van Driem (2001:870) proposes that the Greater Bumthang (East Bodish) languages, including Bumthang, Khengkha, and Kurtöp, may have a Gongduk substratum. Gongduk itself may also have a non-Tibeto-Burman substrate.

Gerber (2018) notes that Gongduk has had extensive contact with Black Mountain Mönpa before the arrival of East Bodish languages in Bhutan. Gongduk also has many Tshangla loanwords. The following comparative vocabulary table from Gerber (2020) compares Gongduk, Black Mountain Mönpa, and Bjokapakha, which is a divergent Tshangla variety.

Comparison of numerals:

Comparison of pronouns:

Grammar

Morphology
Gongduk has productive suffixal morphology (van Driem 2014).
<-məˀtⁿ> ‘plural suffix in human nouns’
Examples:
oloˀŋməˀtⁿ ‘children’ < oloˀk ‘child’ + -məˀtⁿ
ŋidɤməˀtⁿ ‘people’ < ŋidɤ ‘person’ + -məˀtⁿ
aroˀŋməˀtⁿ ‘friends’ < aroˀk ‘friend’ + -məˀtⁿ

However, non-human plural nouns do not take on any suffixes, and remain the same:
kurtə ‘horse, horses’
kəitɤ ‘bird, birds’
kiŋ ‘house, houses’

<-e ~ -ðe ~ -θe> ‘ergative and possessive suffix’
Examples:
bɤʔlɤpə-e ‘the people of Bɤʔlɤ [ergative]’
choŋnən-ðe me ‘the seed of the maize’
nor-θe taɦ ‘meat of the cow [beef]’
rek-θe rukɤŋ ‘head bone [skull]’
aroʔk-te-θe ‘the friend [ergative]’
əp drəkpə-e ‘Ap Drakpa [ergative]’
θok-θe əkəm ‘egg of offering (sacrificial egg)’
lei-ti-ðe juʔmə ‘after one month’

<-gi> ‘ablative suffix’
Examples:
ðiŋ goŋduʔ-gi əna ‘We are from Gongduk’
nikkələŋ-gi ‘by way of the stairs’
dəkθə-gi ‘from Daksa’
kidu-gi ‘as a kidu [government gift]’
bɤʔlɤ-gi ‘from Bɤʔlɤ’
deŋkəle wɤŋ-gi ‘from Dengkalé Dale’
doʔmoŋ-gi ‘from "Black Roof" village’
phəjoŋ pəm-gi ‘from Phajong Pam’

<-gu ~ -go ~ -ku ~-ko> ‘dative / locative suffix’
Examples:
gərəŋ-go ‘to whom’
ohaŋ duʔ-gu ‘in that village’
rek-ko ‘to [his] head’
ðə-go ‘to me’
jə-go ‘to India’
gaoŋ-go ‘whereto, where precisely’
pəkpək-ko ‘at times, sometimes’
thimphu-gu ‘to Thimphu’

Demonstratives
Gongduk demonstratives precede head nouns.
ohaŋ ‘that (demonstrative)’
Examples:
ohaŋ ŋidɤ ‘that person’
ohaŋ koŋ ‘that tree’
ohaŋ duʔgu ‘in that village’

Personal pronouns
Gongduk has the following personal pronoun paradigm.

van Driem (2014) compares the Gongduk first person singular personal pronoun ðə 'I, me' to Kathmandu Newar dʑiː ~ dʑĩ- 'I, me' and Tshangla dʑaŋ ~ dʑi- ~ dʑiŋ- 'I, me'. He also compares the Gongduk first person plural personal pronoun ðiŋ 'we, us' to Kathmandu Newar dʑʰai ~ dʑʰĩ- 'we, us'.

Vocabulary
The Gongduk words and phrases below are from van Driem (2014).

Basic vocabulary

rek ‘head’
rukɤŋ ‘bone’
əŋ ‘language, mouth’
dɤŋli ‘water’
wɤ ‘rain’
yər ‘cliff’
dɤ ‘salt’
ɤn ‘tooth’
koŋ ‘tree’
diŋ ‘wood’
me ‘seed’
dola ‘cooked Setaria or rice’
choŋnən ‘maize’
ɤwɤ ‘banana’
taɦ ‘meat’
wərə ‘highland paddy, ghaiyā’
khərəŋ ‘cooked Panicum or maize’
don ‘pig’
nor ‘cow’
kurtə ‘horse’
kəitɤ ‘bird’
əkəm ‘egg’
jə ‘day (24-hour period)’
lei ‘month’
oloʔk ‘child’
ŋidɤ ‘person’
aroʔk ‘friend’
duʔ ‘village’
kiŋ ‘house’
nikkələŋ ‘stairs’
θok ‘offering’
goŋduʔ ‘Gongduk’

Numerals

ti ‘1’
niktsə ‘2’
towə ‘3’
diyə, piyə ‘4’
ŋəwə ‘5’
qukpə ‘6’
ðukpə ‘7’
yitpə, hetpə ‘8’
ɢuwə ‘9’
deyə ‘10’
deθəti ‘11’
deθəniktsə ‘12’
deθətowə ‘13’
khəe ‘score (20)’
khəe ŋəwə ‘five score, i.e. one hundred’

Interrogative pronouns

gərəŋ ‘who’
gərəe ‘whose’
θəpo ‘what’
ko ‘when’
gaoŋ ‘where, whither’
qəti ‘how much, how many’
gainəŋ ‘which, whence’
qətigu ‘at what time’
θəu, θəudi ‘why, how come’
gora, gorapəm ‘how, in which way’
ohaŋ ‘that (demonstrative)’

References

Bibliography

Gerber, Pascal. 2019. Gongduk agreement morphology in functional and diachronic perspective.  Paper presented at the ISBS Inaugural Conference, Magdalen College, University of Oxford.

van Driem, George. 2014. Gongduk Nominal Morphology and the phylogenetic position of Gongduk. Paper presented at the 20th Himalayan Languages Symposium, Nanyang Technological University, Singapore, 16 July 2014.

External links 
 ELAR archive of Documentation of the flora and fauna of Gongduk

Endangered Sino-Tibetan languages
Unclassified Sino-Tibetan languages
Languages of Bhutan
Bodic languages
Languages written in Tibetan script